Robert Westfield (born 1972) is an American writer, who won two Lambda Literary Awards in 2007 for his debut novel Suspension. The novel, published in 2006 by Harper Perennial, was nominated for and won Lambdas in the categories of Gay Fiction and Gay Debut Fiction.

Born in 1972 in Maryland, Westfield attended Columbia University in New York City, earning a degree in Theatre and English, and winning several student awards for his writing. He has also written several plays, including A Wedding Album, The Pennington Plot, A Tulip Economy and A Home Without, as well as acting as cowriter and dramaturg for plays by Marc Wolf, including Blessed Plot and Another American: Asking and Telling. His second novel, tentatively titled The Sightseers, has not yet been published.

References

External links

1972 births
American male novelists
21st-century American dramatists and playwrights
21st-century American novelists
American gay writers
American LGBT novelists
American LGBT dramatists and playwrights
Novelists from Maryland
Writers from New York City
Columbia College (New York) alumni
Living people
Lambda Literary Award for Gay Fiction winners
American male dramatists and playwrights
21st-century American male writers
Novelists from New York (state)
Lambda Literary Award for Debut Fiction winners